Cathal Ó hOisín is an Irish Sinn Féin politician who was a Member of the Northern Ireland Assembly (MLA) for East Londonderry from 2011 to 2016. He lost his seat to his party running mate Caoimhe Archibald at the 2016 election.

Ó hOisín was educated at St. Patrick's College, Maghera and Magee College, Derry.  He was first elected to Limavady Borough Council at the 2005 local elections for the Benbradagh electoral area. He served as Mayor of Limavady from 2009 to 2010.  At the 2010 general election, he stood unsuccessfully in East Londonderry, taking second place with 19.3% of the vote.

References

External links
 NIA profile

1963 births
Living people
Sinn Féin MLAs
Northern Ireland MLAs 2011–2016
People from Dungiven
Mayors of places in Northern Ireland
Members of Limavady Borough Council
Politicians from County Londonderry
Sinn Féin councillors in Northern Ireland
Sinn Féin parliamentary candidates